William or Bill Sykes may refer to:

 Bill Sykes (born 1948), Member for Benalla in the Victorian Parliament
 Bill Sykes (priest) (1939–2015), English chaplain and author
 William Sykes (convict) (1827–1891), convict transported to Western Australia
 William Sykes (priest) (1861–1930), Anglican clergyman
 William Sykes (businessman) (1852–1910), English manufacturer of sporting goods
 William Henry Sykes (1790–1872), Indian Army officer
 William Sykes (cricketer) (1823–1915), English clergyman and cricketer
 William Robert Sykes (1840–1917), British engineer from London
 William Stanley Sykes (1894–1961), British anaesthetist and crime writer
 Charles Henry Sykes (1882–1942), known as Bill, American cartoonist

See also
 Bill Sikes, a fictional character in Oliver Twist by Charles Dickens, sometimes misspelled Bill Sykes